The 27th Guards Motor Rifle Division (Military Unit Number 35100) was a Red Army rifle division in World War II which later became a Soviet Army motor rifle division.

History 
The division draws its history from the 75th Naval Rifle Brigade formed in the end of 1941. As part of the 3rd Shock Army, Kalinin Front in 1942 the brigade participated in the Demiansk operations - the Moscow counteroffensive. For its fighting performance it became the 3rd Guards Rifle Brigade in March 1942, having spent all its time in reserve, became the 27th Guards Rifle Division in April–May 1942. With a view to the preservation of fighting and revolutionary traditions of earlier formations, the name "Omsk" which 27th Rifle Division had during the Russian Civil War had earlier was given to the new division. It included the 76th Guards Rifle Regiment (:ru:76-й гвардейский стрелковый полк), the predecessor to today's 15th Separate Motor Rifle Brigade.

In the late summer of 1942, it was rushed south to help stop the German offensive into the northern Caucasus and Stalingrad. It took part in the destruction of the German 6th Army during the winter of 1942/43. During World War II the division was part of the 4th Tank Army, 1st Guards Army, the 24th Army, the 66th Army, the 65th Army and since February 1943 the 62nd Army. In April 1942 the 62nd Army became the Eighth Guards Army. In July 1942 the division was part of Kalinin Front's 58th Army, alongside 16th Guards Rifle Division and two other rifle divisions. The division was back with the 8th Guards Army of the 1st Belorussian Front in May 1945.

The division participated in the Battle of Stalingrad, Izyum-Barvenkovo, Donbass, Zaporozhye, Nikopol-Krivoi Rog, Bereznegova-Snigirovka, Odessa, Lublin - Brest, Poznań, Küstrin, Warsaw-Poznan and the Berlin offensive operation. For services in battle the division was awarded the honorific "Novobug" in March 1944, then awarded the Order of the Red Banner and Order of Bogdan Khmelnitsky 2nd degrees. Over 10 thousand of its soldiers were awarded awards and medals, and 7 were awarded the Hero of the Soviet Union. Its commanders included Colonel Konstantin Vindushev (1942), and Viktor Glebov (1942–1945), Glebov was originally a colonel but was made a general-major in November 1942.

Since 1945 the division remained as part of the Group of Soviet Forces in Germany, where it became 21st Guards Mechanised Division, then 21st Guards Motor Rifle Division on 17 May 1957. On 17 November 1964 it was renamed 27th Guards Motor Rifle Division. It remained in Germany until May 1991, when it was withdrawn to Totskoye in the Volga-Ural Military District. It has contributed many personnel for peacekeeping operations.

The division was renamed the 21st Guards Motor Rifle Brigade on 1 June 2009, after the beginning of the 2008 Russian military reform.

Composition in Germany, c1988
Source: Craig Crofoot, GSFG manuscript available at www.microarmormayhem.com, and Holm 2015.
Division Headquarters – Halle, East Germany 51° 29′ 40″ north, 11° 55′ 40″ east
68th Guards Motor Rifle Regiment (BMP) – Halle 51° 26′ 30″ north, 11° 56′ 50″ east
243rd Guards Motor Rifle Regiment (BTR) – Halle 51° 29′ 40″ north, 11° 55′ 40″ east
244th Guards Motor Rifle Regiment (BTR) – Schlotheim 51° 15′ 50″ north, 10° 38′ 30″ east
28th Tank Regiment – Halle 51° 29′ 40″ north, 11° 55′ 40″ east
54th Guards Self-Propelled Artillery Regiment – Halle 51° 29′ 40″ north, 11° 55′ 40″ east
286th Guards Anti-Aircraft Missile Regiment – Halle 51° 29′ 40″ north, 11° 55′ 40″ east
488th Independent Anti-Tank Battalion – Halle 51° 29′ 40″ north, 11° 55′ 40″ east
5th Independent Reconnaissance & Radio EW Battalion – Mühlhausen 51° 12′ 20″ north, 10° 27′ 00″ east
35th Independent Guards Signals Battalion – Halle 51° 29′ 40″ north, 11° 55′ 40″ east
29th Independent Guards Engineer-Sapper Battalion – Halle 51° 26′ 40″ north, 11° 57′ 10″ east
44th Repair-Reconstruction Battalion
367th Independent Chemical Defence Battalion
21st Independent Medical-Sanitation Battalion
1126th Independent Material Support Battalion
327th independent Helicopter Squadron - Schlotheim

Composition c.2001
Source warfare.ru
HQ 27th Motor Rifle Division [2nd Combined-Arms Army]
81st Motor Rifle Regiment, Samara [27th MRD](Agentstvo Voyennykh Novostey, 5 Mar 01; 21 Jan 03).
152nd Tank Regiment(Agentstvo Voyennykh Novostey, 13 Sep 01).
433rd Motor Rifle Regiment [27th MRD](Agentstvo Voyennykh Novostey, 13 Sep 01).

Sources

http://samsv.narod.ru/Div/Sd/gvsd027/default.html
Bonn, Slaughterhouse: Handbook of the Eastern Front, 2005, p. 365

027
Military units and formations established in 1964
Military units and formations disestablished in 2009
Military units and formations awarded the Order of the Red Banner
1964 establishments in the Soviet Union
2009 disestablishments in Russia